Roberto Jorge D'Alessandro di Ninno (born 28 July 1949) is an Argentine retired football goalkeeper and manager. He is also one of the hosts of the Spanish TV program El Chiringuito de Jugones, which specializes in football-related debates.

He played most of his career with Salamanca in Spain, appearing in nine La Liga seasons and more than 300 official games with the club. He subsequently embarked in a managerial career in the same country, coaching several teams.

Playing career
Born in Buenos Aires, D'Alessandro played six years in his country with San Lorenzo de Almagro, being part of the squads that won four Argentine Primera División championships. In June 1974 the team played UD Salamanca in a friendly, and the Spaniards were so impressed by the player they decided to purchase him, having to (successfully) deal with the Argentine Football Association first – players under 26 were prohibited from playing abroad – he was 25.

D'Alessandro stayed in goal for the Castile and León side over ten seasons, nine of those in La Liga. In a match against Athletic Bilbao during the 1976–77 season, his collision with Athletic Bilbao's Dani resulted in a tear in his kidney, even though the player finished the game. After having the organ removed, he resumed his football activity against all medical advice, still putting on several solid campaigns.

D'Alessandro retired in June 1984 at the age of 35 following Salamanca's relegation, having made 242 appearances in the Spanish top flight (284 across all competitions), a club record.

Coaching career
D'Alessandro started coaching at his last club, being in charge of both the youth and reserve teams. His first three professional seasons were spent in Segunda División, with UE Figueres (two years) and Real Betis.

In late March 1994, d'Alessandro became Atlético Madrid's sixth coach in the season, being appointed as the team, led by elusive chairman Jesús Gil, was placed in the relegation zone. The Colchoneros eventually finished in 12th position, and his contract was not renewed; he returned to Madrid for a second spell in November, taking the place of Francisco Maturana and being himself dismissed after 13 games.

D'Alessandro briefly worked with Salamanca in 1995–96, with the team suffering top-division relegation. He then signed for CP Mérida of the second tier, being promoted in his first year and relegated in his second. He continued his career at that level, working with three teams including another spell with his main one.

In April 2010, after several years working as a sports commentator in both radio and television, d'Alessandro returned to Salamanca for his third stint as a manager, eventually managing to avoid relegation from the second division. On 31 October 2011 he joined another team in that tier, Gimnàstic de Tarragona, replacing fired Juan Carlos Oliva as the team ranked in last position. His first game in charge was a 5–0 home win against Catalonia neighbours CE Sabadell FC; however, after not being able to prevent the final drop even though the results improved overall, he resigned.

Honours

Individual
Ricardo Zamora Trophy: 1974–75, 1976–77

Manager
Mérida
Segunda División: 1996–97

References

External links

Nàstic Grana profile 

1949 births
Living people
Footballers from Buenos Aires
Argentine footballers
Association football goalkeepers
Argentine Primera División players
San Lorenzo de Almagro footballers
La Liga players
Segunda División players
UD Salamanca players
Argentine expatriate footballers
Expatriate footballers in Spain
Argentine expatriate sportspeople in Spain
Argentine football managers
La Liga managers
Segunda División managers
UE Figueres managers
Real Betis managers
Atlético Madrid managers
UD Salamanca managers
Elche CF managers
Rayo Vallecano managers
Gimnàstic de Tarragona managers
SD Huesca managers
Argentine expatriate football managers
Expatriate football managers in Spain